Shane Hernandez (born August 23, 1982) is an American politician and architect who served in the Michigan House of Representatives from the 83rd district from 2017 to 2020.

He lost to Lisa McClain in the August 4 Republican Party primary election. On August 19, 2022, the Republican nominee for Michigan Governor Tudor Dixon selected Hernandez as her choice for running mate for the 2022 Michigan gubernatorial election.

References

1982 births
21st-century American politicians
American politicians of Mexican descent
Lawrence Technological University alumni
Living people
Republican Party members of the Michigan House of Representatives
People from Port Huron, Michigan